This Last Night in Sodom is the third full-length album by the English synth-pop duo Soft Cell. It was released in March 1984, about a month after the duo (Marc Almond and David Ball) publicly announced they were dissolving the partnership. The album peaked at number 12 in the UK Album Chart, and would be Soft Cell's last album for 18 years.

Background
The album represents a shift in style from the delicate, erotic, dancefloor-friendly pop of their earlier records and contains a more eclectic mix of styles as well, from the Spanish-influenced "L'Esqualita" (inspired by the drag bar in New York City called "La Escuelita") to the rockabilly-tinged "Down in the Subway". The thematic elements of the songs are also noticeably darker, even for Soft Cell, and center around self-destruction and the breakdown of innocence. "Meet Murder My Angel", according to Almond, is about the mind of a murderer before he slaughters his victim, while "Where Was Your Heart (When You Needed It Most)" centres on a girl who loses all self-esteem after being raped while intoxicated. The first single from the album was "Soul Inside", which reached number 16 on the UK charts in September 1983. "Down in the Subway" was released as the second single, peaking at number 24 in March 1984.

The artwork was originally printed entirely in red and gold ink, down to the liner notes, lyrics, LP labels, and serial number. The album was largely a critical success, but ultimately received little commercial attention, and has since gone out of print. A remastered version with bonus tracks, which included a 12" single mix of "Soul Inside", a cover version of the theme from the James Bond film You Only Live Twice, and "Her Imagination", cut during a session at the BBC, was also released, although this too has since gone out of print and copies are quite rare, the full album including extra tracks is, as fortune would have it, readily available for official download.

Track listing
 "Mr. Self Destruct" – 3:12
 "Slave to This" – 5:04
 "Little Rough Rhinestone" – 4:33
 "Meet Murder My Angel" – 4:39
 "The Best Way to Kill" – 4:43
 "L'Esqualita" – 7:03
 "Down in the Subway" – 2:51
 "Surrender to a Stranger" – 3:38
 "Soul Inside" – 4:25
 "Where Was Your Heart (When You Needed It Most)" – 5:09

Extra tracks on remastered CD: Some Bizzare / Mercury (558,267-2, June 1998)

 "Disease and Desire" – 4:02 [B-side of "Down in the Subway"]
 "Born to Lose" – 2:52 [B-side of "Down in the Subway" 12"]
 "You Only Live Twice" – 4:30 [B-side of "Soul Inside"]
 "007 Theme" – 3:34 [B-side of "Soul Inside" 12"]
 "Soul Inside" (12" mix) – 11:57
 "Her Imagination" – 5:21 [B-side of "Soul Inside" double 7"]

Personnel
Soft Cell
 Marc Almond – vocals, percussion, (guitar on "The Best Way to Kill")
 David Ball – keyboards, instruments, bass, guitar, percussion
with:
 Gary Barnacle – saxophone
 Gini Ball – vocals
 Richard Smith – liner notes (1998 re-issue)

References

Soft Cell albums
1984 albums
Sire Records albums
Vertigo Records albums
Mercury Records albums
Some Bizzare Records albums